The Windermere Cruising Association is a sailing club located at Windermere, a lake in Cumbria, England.

Formed in 1967, the Windermere Cruising Association (WCA) is a sailing club with a programme of social, cruising and racing. The club is RYA accredited and does not possess a club house, relying on local venues - indoors and on the banks of the lake - for its meetings and events.

Winter Series 
The WCA organises the Windermere Series. Over 50 yachts take part in this competitive series every other Sunday from November to March.

External links 
 Homepage of the WCA

1967 establishments in England
Sports organisations of the United Kingdom
Sport in Cumbria
Yacht clubs in England